The following is a list of colonial secretaries of Barbados:

Footnotes

See also 
 List of governors of Barbados

Notes

External links
 Barbados in 1911

Colonial government in Barbados
Colony of Barbados people
Government of Barbados
Barbados history-related lists